Thorkild Peter Rudolph Jacobsen (7 June 1904 – 2 May 1993) was a renowned Danish historian specializing in Assyriology and Sumerian literature. He was one of the foremost scholars on the ancient Near East.

Biography
Thorkild Peter Rudolph Jacobsen received, in 1927, an M.A. from the University of Copenhagen and then came to the United States to study at the Oriental Institute of the University of Chicago, where, in 1929, he received his Ph.D.

He was a field Assyriologist for the Iraq Expedition of the Oriental Institute from 1929 to 1937) and in 1946 became director of the Oriental Institute. He served as Dean of the Humanities Division from 1948 to 1951, as an editor of the Assyrian Dictionary from 1955 to 1959, and as Professor of Social Institutions from 1946–1962.

In 1962, Jacobsen became a professor of Assyriology at Harvard University, where he remained until his retirement in 1974. Beyond being an expert translator, he was a brilliant interpreter whose insights led to a deeper understanding and appreciation of the institutions and normative references of Sumerian and Akkadian culture.

Jacobsen retired as a professor of Assyriology at Harvard University in 1974. In 1974 he  served as a Visiting Professor at UCLA where he helped develop a strong Assyriology program. Dr. Jacobsen served 1993 as president of the American Oriental Society, an organization of scholars. He was also an elected member of the American Philosophical Society and the American Academy of Arts and Sciences. He was 88 years of age when he died in Bradford, New Hampshire.

Selected works
Sumerian King List (1939)
The Temple Oval at Khafajah - chapter by Thorkild Jacobsen  (1940)
 The Intellectual Adventure of Ancient Man: An Essay of Speculative Thought in the Ancient Near East (1946; 1977) with Henri & Henriette Frankfort, John Wilson, William Irwin
Towards the Image of Tammuz and Other Essays on Mesopotamian History and Culture - edited by William L. Moran (1970)
The Treasures of Darkness: A History of Mesopotamian Religion (1976)
The Harps that Once... Sumerian Poetry in Translation (1987)

Partial list of excavations
Eshnunna 
Khafajah 
Tell Agrab 
Tell Ishchali 
Lagash

Awards
Jacobsen was awarded a Guggenheim Fellowship in Near Eastern Studies in 1968.

References

Sources
In Memoriam by J. A. Brinkman. The Oriental Institute

External links
Bio at the CDLI wiki

1904 births
1993 deaths
Danish academics
University of Chicago alumni
Harvard University faculty
Danish Assyriologists
Danish emigrants to the United States
University of Chicago faculty
Members of the American Philosophical Society